Donna Giovanna, the Trickster of Salerno (Italian: Donna Giovanna, l'ingannatrice di Salerno) is a play written by the Italian poet, writer, dramatist, librettist and academic Menotti Lerro. The original title was just Donna Giovanna first published on 2015, performed on 25 November 2017 at the Biblioteca Marucelliana of Florence. The play is considered an innovative feminine and bisexual version of the mythical figure of Don Juan, El Burlador de Sevilla.

Analysis and criticism 

The drama has been analyzed by the literary critic Francesco D’Episcopo from The University of Naples Federico II in the volume Menotti Lerro. Tra Drammaturgia e Narrativa (Genesi: 2019). In addition the play has been the subject of a degree dissertation by a student, Sara Cudia, from the University of Palermo. The same text became later the basis for a critical book about the innovative figure of a female and bisexual Don Juan with the title Donna Giovanna di Menotti Lerro. L'innovazione del mito (Zona:2020).
The Trickster of Salerno, Donna Giovanna, has been quickly perceived by critics as a brilliant character able to replace the outdated famous historical version that was, in fact, losing reasons to exist, due to profound changes occurring in our contemporary society's views of libertinism and seduction.
The new figure became popular after some fascinating representations: Florence (Biblioteca Marucelliana) Milan (Teatro Fontana), Naples (Teatro Sancarluccio) Borgo San Lorenzo (Villa Pecori Giraldi) and Vallo della Lucania (Teatro Leo de Berardinis). Furthermore, artists have dedicated operas at the new female libertine.

Characters 

Donna Giovanna - protagonist (has married a noble man); Bored of her hasband and men in general she starts to feel deep attraction to people of the same sex  
Dario - devote servant of Donna Giovanna
Don Ruggero - Donna Giovanna husband, often away for business reasons
Concettina - devote servant of Donna Giovanna; she will discover unsuspected homosexual feeling in herself
Brunella - victim of Donna Giovanna, she will commit suicide feeling ashamed to have been cheated and seduced 
Arturo - Brunella'hasband. Will be manipulated from Donna Giovanna till to die for it
GB - a rich man
Alice - hairdresser seduced from Donna Giovanna
Carolina - hairdresser
Spettro - ghost with triple identity: Arturo, Brunella and Donna Giovanna's father.

Opera libretto 

The play has been also published as a libretto for opera with the title Donna Giovanna, l'ingannatrice di Salerno, with prefaces of Maurizio Cucchi and Enrico Renna.

Bibliography 
Francesco D'Episcopo, Menotti Lerro, tra drammaturgia e narrativa (Genesi: 2019).
Sara Cudia, Donna Giovanna, l'innovazione del mito, Thesis dissertation discussed at The University of Palermo on 2019.
Sara Cudia, Donna Giovanna, l'innovazione del mito, (Zona: 2020). 
Valentina Sentsova, in La solitudine dei miti (Genesi: 2021), pp. 41–170. Donna Giovanna translated in Russian language. 
Donna Giovanna, l'ingannatrice di Salerno (Zona:2016 - with parallel translations into English, Spanish and Romanian languages) - Prefaces by Francesco D'Episcopo and Maria Rita Parsi

References

External links 
OPAC 
COPAC

2015 plays
Plays set in Italy
Works based on the Don Juan legend